Janich is a surname. Notable people with the surname include:

Agnes Janich (born 1985), Polish visual artist
Francesco Janich (1937–2019), Italian footballer
Oliver Janich (born 1973), German author, journalist and politician
Peter Janich (1942–2016), German professor of philosophy